Baidyapur Jora Deul is a 16th-century temple at Baidyapur in the Kalna II CD block in the Kalna subdivision of the Purba Bardhaman district in the Indian state of West Bengal.

Location
  

Baidyapur is on the Boinchi-Kalna Road and the nearest railway station is Bainchigram railway station on the Howrah-Bardhaman main line.

History
Baidyapur Jora Deul was built in 1550 by Subhananda Pal. The two brick-built temples, with square bases probably had domed top in their original shape. Their faceds are of carved bricks.The main temple faces east and the small north and they are interconnected with a passage and is datable to c.1550 A.D. The larger temple has an inscription over its domway.

According to the List of Monuments of National Importance in West Bengal the two ancient temples (joined together) at Baidyapur is an ASI listed monument.

Jora Deul picture gallery

References

External links

Hindu temples in West Bengal
Monuments of National Importance in West Bengal
Tourist attractions in Purba Bardhaman district